Agliano is a frazione of the comune of Campello sul Clitunno in the Province of Perugia, Umbria, central Italy. It stands at an elevation of 1030 metres above sea level. At the time of the Istat census of 2001 it had 8 inhabitants.

References 

Frazioni of the Province of Perugia